The 2011–12 Texas Tech Red Raiders basketball team represented Texas Tech University in the 2011–12 NCAA Division I men's basketball season. The Red Raiders were led by Billy Gillispie in his first and only season as head coach. The team played its home games at the United Spirit Arena in Lubbock, Texas and were members of the Big 12 Conference.

Schedule

|-
!colspan=12 style="background:#CC0000; color:black;"| Exhibition

|-
!colspan=12 style="background:#CC0000; color:black;"| Non-Conference Regular Season

|-
!colspan=12 style="background:#CC0000; color:black;"| Big 12 Regular Season

|-
!colspan=12 style="background:#CC0000; color:black;"| 2012 Big 12 men's basketball tournament

Rankings

References

External links
Official Texas Tech Red Raiders men's basketball page 

Texas Tech Red Raiders basketball seasons
Texas Tech
Texas Tech
Texas Tech